Chauncy Welliver (born 28 April 1983) is an American-New Zealand heavyweight boxer from Spokane, Washington who lived in Auckland, New Zealand. He has a career record of 57–13–5. Throughout his career he has never been knocked down and at one point the WBC ranked him the 5th best heavyweight in the world.

Career
He came to widespread attention when he fought Odlanier Solís in October 2008. He lost when the referee intervened in the ninth round but impressed many with his skills and decent chin.

Welliver was then rated in the top 10 for some time by both the WBC and WBO after picking up numerous titles from limited opposition. His ranking dropped however when he suffered two defeats in 2012, being outpointed by Sherman Williams and Kyotaro Fujimoto.

His ring name is the Hillyard Hammer. He is currently trained by former Native American heavyweight title challenger, Joe "The Boss" Hipp.
His current manager is Roland Jankelson. He is also a heavyweight consultant for the boxing radio show On The Ropes. Welliver trains and coaches amateur boxers at Boxfit in Spokane, Washington.

On 31 January 2015, Welliver lost to rugby football star Sonny Bill Williams, in what he has described as the biggest fight of his career and Williams as "a better athlete than Michael Jordan. YARN"

Professional boxing record

|-
|-  style="text-align:center; background:#e3e3e3;"
|  style="border-style:none none solid solid; "|Res.
|  style="border-style:none none solid solid; "|Record
|  style="border-style:none none solid solid; "|Opponent
|  style="border-style:none none solid solid; "|Result
|  style="border-style:none none solid solid; "|Rd., Time
|  style="border-style:none none solid solid; "|Date
|  style="border-style:none none solid solid; "|Location
|  style="border-style:none none solid solid; "|Notes
|- align=center
|Loss
|55–12–5||align=left| Marselles Brown
|
|
|
|align=left|
|align=left|
|- align=center
|Loss
|55–11–5||align=left| Sonny Bill Williams
|
|
|
|align=left|
|align=left|
|- align=center
|Loss
|55–10–5
|align=left| Alexander Ustinov
|||
|
|align=left|
|align=left|
|- align=center
|- align=center
|Loss
|55–9–5
|align=left| Lucas Browne
|||
|
|align=left|
|align=left|
|- align=center
|- align=center
|Loss
|55–8–5
|align=left| Billy Wright
|||
|
|align=left|
|align=left|
|- align=center
|Win
|55–7–5
|align=left| Saul Farah
|||
|
|align=left|
|align=left|
|- align=center
|Win
|54–7–5
|align=left| Donnie Davis
|||
|
|align=left|
|align=left|
|- align=center
|Loss
|53–7–5
|align=left| Kyotaro Fujimoto
|||
|
|align=left|
|align=left|
|- align=center
|Loss
|53–6–5
|align=left| Sherman Williams
|||
|
|align=left|
|align=left|
|- align=center
|Win
|53–5–5
|align=left| Bert Cooper
|||
|
|align=left|
|align=left|
|- align=center
|Win
|52–5–5
|align=left| Moyoyo Mensah
|||
|
|align=left|
|align=left|
|- align=center
|Win
|51–5–5
|align=left| Galen Brown
|||
|
|align=left|
|align=left|
|- align=center
|Win
|50–5–5
|align=left| Rob Calloway
|||
|
|align=left|
|align=left|
|- align=center
|Win
|49–5–5
|align=left| Lawrence Tauasa
|||
|
|align=left|
|align=left|
|- align=center
|Win
|48–5–5
|align=left| Byron Polley
|||
|
|align=left|
|align=left|
|- align=center
|Win
|47–5–5
|align=left| Galen Brown
|||
|
|align=left|
|align=left|
|- align=center
|Win
|46–5–5
|align=left| Jimmy Haynes
|||
|
|align=left|
|align=left|
|- align=center
|Win
|45–5–5
|align=left| Brad Gregory
|||
|
|align=left|
|align=left|
|- align=center
|Win
|44–5–5
|align=left| Daniel Tai
|||
|
|align=left|
|align=left|
|- align=center
|Win
|43–5–5
|align=left| Joell Godfrey
|||
|
|align=left|
|align=left|
|- align=center
|Win
|42–5–5
|align=left| Daniel Tai
|||
|
|align=left|
|align=left|
|- align=center
|Win
|41–5–5
|align=left| Mike Sheppard
|||
|
|align=left|
|align=left|
|- align=center
|Win
|40–5–5
|align=left| Seiaute Mailata
|||
|
|align=left|
|align=left|
|- align=center
|Win
|39–5–5
|align=left| Toa Naketoatama
|||
|
|align=left|
|align=left|
|- align=center
|Win
|38–5–5
|align=left| Amosa Zinck
|||
|
|align=left|
|align=left|
|- align=center
|Win
|37–5–5
|align=left| George Westerman
|||
|
|align=left|
|align=left|
|- align=center
|Win
|36–5–5
|align=left| David Gemmell
|||
|
|align=left|
|align=left|
|- align=center
|Loss
|35–5–5
|align=left| Odlanier Solís
|||
|
|align=left|
|align=left|
|- align=center
|Win
|35–4–5
|align=left| Mike Lloyd
|||
|
|align=left|
|align=left|
|- align=center
|Win
|34–4–5
|align=left| Daniel Tai
|||
|
|align=left|
|align=left|
|- align=center
|Win
|33–4–5
|align=left| Oscar Talemaira
|||
|
|align=left|
|align=left|
|- align=center
|style="background:#abcdef;"|Draw
|32–4–5
|align=left| Seiaute Mailata
|||
|
|align=left|
|align=left|
|- align=center
|Win
|32–4–4
|align=left| Corey Williams
|||
|
|align=left|
|align=left|
|- align=center
|Win
|31–4–4
|align=left| Chad Van Sickle
|||
|
|align=left|
|align=left|
|- align=center
|Win
|30–4–4
|align=left| Richard Tutaki
|||
|
|align=left|
|align=left|
|- align=center
|style="background:#abcdef;"|Draw
|29–4–4
|align=left| Chad Van Sickle
|||
|
|align=left|
|align=left|
|- align=center
|Win
|29–4–3
|align=left| Brian McIntyre
|||
|
|align=left|
|align=left|
|- align=center
|Win
|28–4–3
|align=left| Travis Fulton
|||
|
|align=left|
|align=left|
|- align=center
|Win
|27–4–3
|align=left| Chris Lewallen
|||
|
|align=left|
|align=left|
|- align=center
|Win
|26–4–3
|align=left| David Robinson
|||
|
|align=left|
|align=left|
|- align=center
|Win
|25–4–3
|align=left| Scott Lansdon
|||
|
|align=left|
|align=left|
|- align=center
|Win
|24–4–3
|align=left| Bridger Bercier
|||
|
|align=left|
|align=left|
|- align=center
|Win
|23–4–3
|align=left| Ted Reiter
|||
|
|align=left|
|align=left|
|- align=center
|Win
|22–4–3
|align=left| Ted Reiter
|||
|
|align=left|
|align=left|
|- align=center
|Win
|21–4–3
|align=left| Shane Wijohn
|||
|
|align=left|
|align=left|
|- align=center
|Loss
|20–4–3
|align=left| Elisara Sii Uta
|||
|
|align=left|
|align=left|
|- align=center
|Win
|20–3–3
|align=left| Oscar Talemaira
|||
|
|align=left|
|align=left|
|- align=center
|Win
|19–3–3
|align=left| Bob Gasio
|||
|
|align=left|
|align=left|
|- align=center
|Win
|18–3–3
|align=left| Richard Tutaki
|||
|
|align=left|
|align=left|
|- align=center
|Win
|17–3–3
|align=left| Chris Brown
|||
|
|align=left|
|align=left|
|- align=center
|Loss
|16–3–3
|align=left| David Bostice
|||
|
|align=left|
|align=left|
|- align=center
|Loss
|16–2–3
|align=left| John Sargent
|||
|
|align=left|
|align=left|
|- align=center
|Win
|16–1–3
|align=left| Chris Brown
|||
|
|align=left|
|align=left|
|- align=center
|style="background:#abcdef;"|Draw
|15–1–3
|align=left| Ken Murphy
|||
|
|align=left|
|align=left|
|- align=center
|Win
|15–1–2
|align=left| Billy Zumbrun
|||
|
|align=left|
|align=left|
|- align=center
|style="background:#abcdef;"|Draw
|14–1–2
|align=left| John Clark
|||
|
|align=left|
|align=left|
|- align=center
|Win
|14–1–1
|align=left| Wesley Martin
|||
|
|align=left|
|align=left|
|- align=center
|Win
|13–1–1
|align=left| Bradley Rone
|||
|
|align=left|
|align=left|
|- align=center
|Win
|12–1–1
|align=left| King Ipitan
|||
|
|align=left|
|align=left|
|- align=center
|Win
|11–1–1
|align=left| Felipe Bojorquez
|||
|
|align=left|
|align=left|
|- align=center
|Win
|10–1–1
|align=left| Craig Brinson
|||
|
|align=left|
|align=left|
|- align=center
|Win
|9–1–1
|align=left| Bobby McGraw
|||
|
|align=left|
|align=left|
|- align=center
|Win
|8–1–1
|align=left| George Chamberlain
|||
|
|align=left|
|align=left|
|- align=center
|Win
|7–1–1
|align=left| Ricardo Raya
|||
|
|align=left|
|align=left|
|- align=center
|Loss
|6–1–1
|align=left| Jonathan Williams
|||
|
|align=left|
|align=left|
|- align=center
|style="background:#abcdef;"|Draw
|6–0–1
|align=left| Jonathan Williams
|||
|
|align=left|
|align=left|
|- align=center
|Win
|6–0
|align=left| John Clark
|||
|
|align=left|
|align=left|
|- align=center
|Win
|5–0
|align=left| Enoch Green
|||
|
|align=left|
|align=left|
|- align=center
|Win
|4–0
|align=left| Jim Brown
|||
|
|align=left|
|align=left|
|- align=center
|Win
|3–0
|align=left| Jonathan Williams
|||
|
|align=left|
|align=left|
|- align=center
|Win
|2–0
|align=left| Marcio Castillo
|||
|
|align=left|
|align=left|
|- align=center
|Win
|1–0
|align=left| Thomas Eynon
|||
|
|align=left|
|align=left|
|- align=center

References

External links 
 On The Ropes
 
 Spokane Boxfit

1983 births
Living people
Sportspeople from Spokane, Washington
Boxers from Washington (state)
New Zealand professional boxing champions
American male boxers
Boxers from Auckland
Heavyweight boxers